Mamesdytes is a genus of beetles in the family Carabidae, containing the following species:

 Mamesdytes glacialis Trezzi, 2007
 Mamesdytes shawcrossensis Trezzi, 2007

References

Trechinae